The Mosuo (also spelled Moso, Mosso or Musuo), often called the Naxi among themselves, are a small ethnic group living in China's Yunnan and Sichuan provinces. Consisting of a population of approximately 40,000, many of them live in the Yongning region, around Lugu Lake, in Labai, in Muli, and in Yanyuan.

Although the Mosuo are culturally distinct from the Nashi, the Chinese government places them as members of the Nashi minority. The Nashi are about 320,000 people spread throughout different provinces in China. Their culture has been documented by indigenous scholars Lamu Gatusa, Latami Dashi, Yang Lifen and He Mei.

Introduction
The Mosuo are often referred to as China's "last matrilineal society." The Mosuo themselves may also often use the description matriarchal, which they believe increases interest in their culture and thus attracts tourism. However, the terms matrilineal and matriarchal do not reflect the full complexity of their social organization. In fact, it is not easy to categorize Mosuo culture within traditional Western definitions. They have aspects of a matriarchal culture: women are often the head of the house, inheritance is through the female line, and women make business decisions. However, unlike a matriarchy, the political power tends to be in the hands of males. For instance, a man named Ge Ze A Che is the political leader of Luoshui village. However, according to an article by NPR, there was once a time when the political leaders of Mosuo villages were in fact female. The anthropologist Peggy Reeves Sanday has argued that the Musou should be considered a matriarchy. Further, scholars have argued that while matrilineal arrangements are the normative pattern, domestic arrangements still vary geographically and by family circumstance.

Lifestyle

Daily life
Mosuo culture is primarily agrarian, with work based on farming tasks such as raising livestock (yak, water buffalo, sheep, goats, poultry) and growing crops, including grains and potatoes. The people are largely self-sufficient in diet, raising enough for their daily needs. Meat is an important part of their diet and, since they lack refrigeration, is preserved through salting or smoking. The Mosuo are renowned for their preserved pork, which may be kept for 10 years or more. They produce a local alcoholic beverage made from grain, called sulima, which is similar to strong wine. Sulima is drunk regularly and usually offered to guests and at ceremonies and festivals.

Local economies tend to be barter-based. However, increased interaction with the outside world brings greater use of a cash-based trade system. Average incomes are low (US$150–200 per year), causing financial restrictions when cash is needed for activities such as education or travel. Electricity has been introduced in most Mosuo communities, but some villages still lack electric power.

Mosuo homes consist of four rectangular structures arranged in a square, around a central courtyard. The first floor houses livestock, including water buffalo, horses, geese, and poultry. The main cooking, eating and visiting areas are also on the first floor. The second floor is commonly used for storage and for the bedrooms.

Role of women

As soon as a Mosuo girl becomes old enough, she learns the tasks that she will perform for the rest of her life. Mosuo women do all the housework, including cleaning, tending the fire, cooking, gathering firewood, feeding the livestock, and spinning and weaving. In the past, due to isolation, Mosuo women produced all their own household goods. Today, due to increased trade with surrounding villages and cities, it is easier to obtain goods. Nevertheless, some Mosuo women, especially those of older generations, know how to use looms to produce cloth goods.

Role of men

According to some, men have no responsibility in Mosuo society—they have no jobs, rest all day, and conserve their strength for nighttime visits. However, Mosuo men do have roles in their society. They help to bring up the children of their sisters and female cousins, build houses and are in charge of livestock and fishing, which they learn from their uncles and older male family members as soon as they are old enough.

Men deal with the slaughter of livestock, in which women never participate. Slaughtered pigs, in particular, are kept whole and stored in a dry, airy place that keeps them edible for up to ten years. This is especially helpful when harsh winters make food scarce.

Matrilineality       
Mosuo families tend to trace their lineage through the female side of the family. Occasionally, in fact, they may not know who the father of a child is, which does not carry stigma as in many other societies, but is considered embarrassing. Children belong to and reside within their mother's household and have access to its land and resources.

Matriarch
The matriarch (Ah mi, or elder female, in Chinese) is the head of the house. The Ah mi has absolute power; she decides the fate of all those living under her roof. In walking marriages, Mosuo women are responsible for much of the work done around the house and financial decisions. The matriarch also manages the money and jobs of each family member. When the Ah mi wishes to pass her duties on to the next generation, she will give this female successor the keys to the household storage, signifying the passing on of property rights and responsibility.

History
An important historical fact often missed in studies of the Mosuo was that their social organization has traditionally been feudal, with a small nobility controlling a larger peasant population. The Mosuo nobility practiced a "parallel line of descent" that encouraged cohabitation, usually within the nobility, in which the father passed his social status to his sons, while the women passed their status to their daughters. Thus, if a Mosuo commoner female married a male serf, her daughter would be another commoner, while her son would have serf status.

Chuan-Kang Shih argued that matrilineality and "walking marriage" (tisese) is a primary institution of family, sex and reproduction, and marriage is secondary. As Shih argues, marriage, as different from tisese, was introduced into Mosuo society through contact with other ethnic groups during the Yuan and Qing empire-building process.

Adoption
If there are no offspring of one sex, it is common for a child from another family to join an adoptive household. Such a child might come from a large family, or one too small to continue. Children raised in this sense are genealogically linked to their new households. They are treated as equal family members; in some instances, adopted females become the matriarchs of their adoptive families.

Walking marriages

One of the best known aspects of Mosuo culture is its practice of  "walking marriage" (走婚 zǒu hūn in Chinese), although this practice remains poorly understood. Walking marriages are the most prominent form of marriage in Mosuo culture; however, it is not unheard of for women in Mosuo culture to marry outside of their culture, therefore participating in marriages other than walking marriages. In a walking marriage, both partners live under the roof of their respective extended families during the day; however, at night it is common for the man to visit and stay at the women's house (if given permission) until sunrise. Therefore, they do not technically live in the same household, but they are free to visit when granted permission.  Children of parents in a walking marriage are not raised by their father. The brothers of the mother (maternal uncles) in the marriage take on the responsibilities of the father since the father is not typically around during the daytime. Due to the separation of the father and mother, it is crucial for the uncle(s) to play a large role in the development of the child.

Shih (2010) offers the most sophisticated anthropological account of Mosuo practices of sexual union. "All on-going sexual relationships in Mosuo culture are called "walking marriages." These bonds are "based on mutual affection." "When a Mosuo woman or man expresses interest in a potential partner, it is the woman who may give the man permission to visit her. These visits are usually kept secret, with the man visiting the woman's house after dark, spending the night, and returning to his own home in the morning." After the birth of the child, the man has no moral, cultural, or legal obligation to take care of the child. However, the child will be raised with adequate care and attention. The overwhelming support from the woman's extended family allows both the man and woman to engage in sexual relations with whomever they please.

General practice 
"The Mosuo have large extended families, and several generations (great-grandparents, grandparents, parents, children, grandchildren, aunts, uncles, nieces, nephews, etc.) live together in the same house. Everyone lives in communal quarters, and there are no private bedrooms or living areas, except for women between certain ages (see the section on "coming of age", below) who may have their own private rooms."

"While a pairing may be long-term, the man never lives with the woman's family, or vice versa. Mosuo men and women continue to live with and be responsible to their respective families. The couple do not share property. The father usually has little responsibility for his offspring." However, this does not mean that men can wipe their hands free of responsibilities and spend every night participating in shenanigans. After work, they are obligated to go home and help raise their nieces and nephews. The children rely on the collective effort of the extended family rather than that of the biological father.

"A father may indicate an interest in the upbringing of his children by bringing gifts to the mother's family. This gives him status within the mother's family, while not actually making him part of the family."

Matrilineal society 
Unlike other cultures, women in the Mosuo society dominate the household and family. They are responsible for housework, agricultural duties, and taking care of children. In a walking marriage, the ancestral line is most important on the wife's side of the family and the children of the couple reside and belong to the wife's family household. Considering women are responsible for most domestic jobs, they have a larger role in the walking marriage and are viewed with more respect and importance in this society.

Husbands in walking marriages have a much less involved role than wives. The husbands in these relationships are generally the figures who are in charge of all religious and political decisions for the family. Regarding the family responsibilities, the father or husband in the family does not have nearly as many responsibilities regarding the family as the wife does. In fact, the male relatives of the mother's side of the family, such as uncles and cousins, are generally the "father figure" to the husband's children. The mother's brothers occupy a central role in the household. Their roles include disciplining children, caring for them, and supporting the children financially. Since the husband and wife live with their separate immediate families, they help take care of the families' children and issues regarding their household. Even though fathers are involved in their sister's children's lives, they are not necessarily involved in their biological children's life. In walking marriages, the involvement of a father in his child's life is optional. If a father decides to be involved in the upbringing of his own biological child, he can bring gifts and help with work around the woman's household. This relationship can be performed regardless if the woman and man are still in the walking marriage and it gives the man a type of "official status" among the family without being fully involved.

Advantages to a walking marriage 
Other than the child receiving exceptional care and attention from the extended family, there are many inconspicuous advantages for participating in a walking marriage. For example: divorce is never an issue because the man and woman are not legally bound together, thus sharing very few of the same responsibilities. There are also never any disputes over who owns custody of the child since the child belongs to the mother's extended family and takes the mother's last name. In the case of a parent's death, the child still has a prodigious amount of care and affection from the extended family.

Myths and controversies 
Outsiders often believe the following myths:

Mosuo women have many partners 
"While it is possible for a Mosuo woman to change partners as often as she likes, few Mosuo women have more than one partner at a time. Anthropologists call this system "serial monogamy." Most Mosuo form long-term relationships and do not change partners frequently. Some of these pairings may even last a lifetime."

But, in other anthropologists' views, it is a more recent change, "in the face of political campaigns and cultural integration with the Han Chinese", and "previous generations often continued with multiple partners even after a child was born. Some older Na report having upwards of 30, 40, even 50 partners throughout their lifetime" and despite these changes, "notions of exclusivity are not entrenched, and the Na language has no word for 'jealousy'."

Fathers of children are commonly not known 
"The large majority of women know their children's fathers; it is actually a source of embarrassment if a mother cannot identify a child's father. But, "unlike many cultures which castigate mothers and children without clear paternity, Na children induce no such censure". The father of a child born from a walking marriage will not see his child during the day, but rather at night time. The father doesn't play as large a role in the development of the child. "At a child's birth, the father, his mother and sisters come to celebrate, and bring gifts. On New Year's Day, a child visits the father to pay respect to him and his household. A father also participates in the coming-of-age ceremony. Though he does not have an everyday role, the father is nevertheless an important partner."

Customs

Coming of age
The coming-of-age ceremony, which occurs at the age of thirteen, is one of the most important events in a Mosuo child's life. Before this ceremony, Mosuo children all dress the same and are restricted from certain aspects of Mosuo life, particularly those that involve religious rites. Also, a child who dies before this ceremony does not receive the traditional funeral. Once they come of age, girls are given their skirts, and boys are given their trousers (thus, it is called the "skirt ceremony" for girls, and the "trouser ceremony" for boys).

After coming of age, Mosuo females can get their own private bedroom, called a "flowering room"; and, once past puberty, can begin to invite partners for "walking marriages".

Hearth
This is the center of the household. It combines the worship of nature, ancestors, and spirits. Behind the hearth is a slab of stone (called guo zhuang in Chinese) and an ancestral altar where Mosuo household members leave a food offering. They do this before each meal, even when having tea.

Funeral
Death is the domain of men, who make all funeral arrangements. It is the only time men prepare food for family and guests. Usually, every family in the village will send at least one male to help with the preparations. Dabas and Lamas are invited to recite prayers for the deceased. Mosuo believe that if a spirit does not have assistance of a Daba, it will be lost. Without Lamas, a spirit will not be able to attain reincarnation. Caskets are small and square, with the deceased's body placed in the fetal position so that it can be reborn in the next life. During cremation, a decorated horse is led around the fire, which Mosuo believe will help carry the deceased's spirit away. Afterwards, friends and family gather to pay their last respects and wish the deceased an easy journey to their ancestral land.

Dogs
While some Asian cultures practice the custom of eating dogs, this is strictly forbidden to the Mosuo. In Mosuo culture, a myth describes that long ago, dogs had life spans of 60 years while humans had life spans of thirteen years. Humans felt their life span was too short, so they traded it with the dogs in exchange for paying homage to them. Therefore, dogs are valued members of the family. They are never killed, and they most certainly are never eaten. During the initiation rites into adulthood, Mosuo adolescents pray before the family dogs.

Religion
Religion is a major part of Mosuo life. It is made up of two coexisting beliefs: their own syncretic faith called Daba and the influence of Tibetan Buddhism.

Daba
Daba has been a part of Mosuo culture for thousands of years, handed down through generations by word of mouth. It functions as a repository of most of the Mosuo culture and history. It is based on animistic principles and involves ancestor worship and the worship of a mother goddess: "The Mosuo are alone among their neighbors to have a guardian mother goddess rather than a patron warrior god".

The primary tasks of the priest (or shaman), also called daba, are to perform exorcisms and assist deceased spirits. Priests drink alcohol until they go into a trance and can converse with these spirits. Since the Mosuo have no written language, there is no religious script, nor is there a temple. All Daba priests are male, and they live in their mother's house with their brothers and sisters. When not pursuing their religious duties, they engage in everyday tasks such as fishing and herding.

On a day-to-day basis, Daba plays a far smaller role in the lives of the Mosuo. The daba is mostly called on to perform traditional ceremonies at key events, such as naming a child, a child's coming-of-age ceremony, a funeral, or special events such as the Spring Festival. The daba is also called on to perform specific rites if someone is sick.

A cultural crisis is emerging. Due to past Chinese government policies, which made being a Daba priest illegal (this policy has now ceased), there are very few remaining dabas, most of whom are old men. This leads some Mosuo to worry that Mosuo history and heritage may be lost when the current generation of Dabas are gone.

Buddhism
Buddhism has started to play a larger role in their culture in recent years. Today Tibetan-style Buddhism is the predominant religion, but it has been somewhat adapted to Mosuo society. Like the Buddhist population of Tibet, both lay and monastic Buddhists among the Mosuo eat meat. Mosuo lamas offer prayers of thanks and prayers for the dead, offer basic religious and secular education to young children, and counsel adults. In families with more than one male child, one will most often be sent to be a monk.

The Mosuo even have their own "living Buddha", a man said to be a reincarnation of one of the great Tibetan spiritual leaders. He usually lives in Lijiang, but returns to the main Tibetan temple in Yongning for important spiritual holidays. Many Mosuo families will send at least one male to be trained as a monk, and in recent years, the number of such monks has increased quite significantly. The current Mosuo Living Buddha died of old age in April 2011. 

In most Mosuo homes, a statue of some Buddhist deity can be found above the cooking fire; the family will usually put a small portion of whatever they are cooking in the fire, as an offering to their deity. Tibetan Buddhist holidays and festivals are participated in by the entire Mosuo community.

Economy

The Mosuo are primarily farmers. Subsistence is mostly based on agriculture. Farmers work "seven hours a day and seven months a year". In the past, they cultivated oats, buckwheat, and flax exclusively. This changed under Han influence at the end of the nineteenth century. Since then, these farmers have also cultivated, among other things, corn, sunflowers, soybeans, potatoes and other vegetables such as pumpkins and beans. Potatoes were their main staple for a while until the mid-twentieth century when they began growing rice, which today makes up more than half of annual production. In recent years, subsistence for some Mosuo has shifted dramatically from agriculture due to a thriving tourist industry

Mosuo also keep a variety of livestock. Since the early twentieth century they have raised buffalo, cows, horses, and goats which originated from Han and Tibetan regions. However, their preferred stock is pigs. Pork plays several important roles in Mosuo society. It is fed to guests, is the obligatory offering at funerals, and used as payment or reimbursement. Hua (2001) insists that it is "a kind of currency and... a symbol of wealth".

Once a year, regions of Mosuo males gather for a livestock fair. They travel for miles on buses, horses, or foot to attend. Here men sell and trade livestock to supplement household incomes.

The Mosuo fish on Lake Lugu and also set land-based fish traps; however, they do not use motorboats, and catching fish in open water using their very primitive gear is not easy.

Language

The Mosuo speak Na (a.k.a. Narua), a Naish language (closely related to Naxi), a member of the Sino-Tibetan language family. Although there is no question that the language of the Mosuo and that of the Naxi are closely related, some Mosuo speakers resent the use of the language name Naxi, which is commonly used to refer to the dialect of the town of Lijiang and the surrounding villages. A more adequate name is Na, used in several linguistic publications. The name "Narua" is used in the Summer Institute of Linguistics' inventory of languages, Ethnologue. Narua A collection of audio recordings is available online, and a trilingual glossary has also been posted online. Two book-length descriptions of the language are available, as well as several research articles.

Yongning Na, which is spoken in Yongning township, Lijiang municipality, Yunnan, China, has been documented by Jacques and Michaud (2011).

Script

Like other Chinese, the Mosuo today use Han script for daily communication. The Tibetan script may sometimes be used for religious purposes.

The Mosuo also have their own native religion, called Daba, which uses 32 symbols. "They follow a "primal" belief system. However, the head ritual specialists of the Daba religion, who are called daba, have advanced beyond the stage of spirit-possessed shamans, and also are in possession of a number of sacred texts. Therefore, these practitioners should be categorized as a type of priest." However, there are currently efforts underway to develop a written form of the Mosuo language.

Intercultural exchanges
The Han are the ethnic majority of China, one of the 56 ethnic groups of China. In the Yongning region during the Ming Dynasty. the Mosuo integrated many Han ideals. The Mosuo also accepted Buddhism and adapted it to fit their values. Neither the Cultural Revolution nor trade between different cultures fundamentally changed Mosuo beliefs. But recently, Mosuo society has been rapidly changing.

Modernity
With improved technology, there are better roads and transportation. Young Mosuo men and women use these modes to leave their villages and find employment in neighboring cities. Television has brought the ideas of the modern world and an image of a more affluent lifestyle. Also, men have begun to take jobs independent of the household and earn their own income. Older Mosuo fear emerging property conflicts as a consequence. Care for the family, with younger children generations leaving the villages, is also a concern.

Tourism

Mosuo living near Lugu Lake inhabit an aesthetically pleasing region. Photographers, television crews, writers, and artists are drawn to their homes. This increased attention has also brought tourists. Tourism is primarily domestic and typically occurs as a part of organized tour groups to view a culture that seems "exotic". Tourism has influenced kinship and parenting practices, with Mosuo residing in areas where tourism is prevalent being less likely to adhere to strict matrilineal norms.

Films
There are many documentaries made about the Mosuo, in English and Mandarin, and there has even been a film festival dedicated to some of them. Most films perpetuate the myth that women run the society, some even claiming that men have no say in political or household matters and do not work.
 "Without Fathers or Husbands" (1995, 26 min., Royal Anthropological Institute). Made by Chinese born, French educated anthropologist Cai Hua. It does not make claims about matriarchy.
 "A World without Fathers and Husbands" Eric Blavier (2000, 52 min.)
 "The Ladies of the Lake: A Matriarchal Society" (20 min.)
Elsewhere (2001)
 Mosso, the Land of Free Love: The Last Matriarchy (2006, 50 min.)
 Mosso, the Land of Free Love: Walking Marriage (2006, 50 min.)
 Kingdom of Women: The Matriarchal Mosuo of China (2007, 54 min.)
 "Frontline World: The Women's Kingdom" (July 19, 2005, 9 min.)
 "Frontline World: stories from a small planet" (June 27, 2006, 9 min)
 [Mosuo Song Journey], by Diedie Weng and Carol Bliss (2007, 37 minutes)
 Kingdom of Women - A Reflection of a Matriarchal Society on Lugu Lake (58 minutes)
 "Taboo: Sex", National Geographic Channel (2008)
 The Mosuo Sisters (2012, 80 min.). A tale of two sisters living in the shadow of two Chinas directed by Marlo Poras.
 "Free Love," National Geographic Channel (2008)
"The Fall of Womenland," Director: Xiaodan He (2009)
"The Land Where Women Rule: Inside China's Last Matriarchy." Broadly staff. 2016. Broadly. October. 2016.
Sunny Side of Sex (2011)  by Sunny Bergman

Pop Culture

In the Children of the Gods urban fantasy book series by IT Lucas, a few members of the immortals visit Lake Luga to an archaeological dig. While there, they find evidence that the Mosuo might have descended from a related-to-the-immortals alien race. Based on their matrilineal culture as well as ancient symbols and imagery.

See also
 Chiefdom of Yongning
 Chinese marriage 
 Kettu Kalyanam
 List of ethnic groups in China
 List of matrilineal or matrilocal societies
 Lugu Lake
 Matriarchy
 Matrilineality
 Matrilocal residence
 Mosuo women
 Nashi people
 Sambandam
 Yang Erche Namu, a notable Chinese writer, singer and TV star of Mosuo ethnicity

Bibliography
 Barber, Nigel."Chinese tribe without marriage points to future" Huffington Post January 2014. Huffington Post. October 2016. 
 Dashi, Latami (editor). 摩梭社会文化研究论文集 (1960–2005)，云南大学出版社，主编：拉他咪达石 
 Gong, Binglin, Huibin Yan, and Chun-Lei Yang. "Gender Differences in the Dictator Experiment: Evidence from the Matrilineal Mosuo and the Patriarchal Yi." SSRN Electronic Journal (2010): 1-25. Web. 25 Oct. 2016. 
 Hamon, Raeann R.; and Bron B Ingoldsby (editors). Mate Selection: Across Cultures, Sage Publications: Thousand Oaks, California, 2003.
 Hua, Cai. A Society Without Fathers or Husbands: The Na of China, New York: Zone Books, 2001.
 Hua, Cai. « Une société sans père ni mari : les Naxi de Chine », Presses Universitaires de France, 2001.
 Hamon, Raeann R.; and Bron B Ingoldsby (editors). Mate Selection: Across Cultures, Sage Publications: Thousand Oaks, California, 2003.
 Mattison, S. M., Scelza, B., & Blumenfield, T. (2014). Paternal Investment and the Positive Effects of Fathers among the Matrilineal Mosuo of Southwest China. American Anthropologist, 116(3), 591–610.
 Mattison, S. M. (2010). Economic impacts of tourism and erosion of the visiting system among the Mosuo of Lugu lake. The Asia Pacific Journal of Anthropology, 11(2), 159–176.
 Mattison, Siobhán M., Brooke Scelza, and Tami Blumenfield. "Paternal Investment and the Positive Effects of Fathers among the Matrilineal Mosuo of Southwest China." American Anthropologist 116.3 (2014): 591–610. Web. 24 Oct. 2016.
 "Matriarchal/Matrilineal Culture." Matriarchal/Matrilineal Culture. Lugu Lake Mosuo Cultural Development Association, 2006. Web. 25 Oct. 2016.
 Mattison, Siobhán. 2010. Economic Impacts of Tourism and Erosion of the Visiting System Among the Mosuo of Lugu Lake. The Asia Pacific Journal of Anthropology, 11: 2, 159 — 176.
 Namu, Yang Erche; and Christine Mathieu. Leaving Mother Lake: A Girlhood at the Edge of the World, Little, Brown: Boston, 2003, 
 Roland J. Hardenberg. Die Moso (China) im interkulturellen Vergleich : Möglichkeiten und Grenzen des komparativen Ansatzes in der Ethnologie. In : Paideuma, vol. 54 (2008), p. 109-127. ISSN 0078-7809.
 Shih, Chuan-kang. Quest for Harmony: The Moso Traditions of Sexual Union & Family Life. Stanford, 2010.
 Stacey, Judith. Unhitched: Love, Sex, and Family Values from West Hollywood to Western China. New York: New York University Press, 2011.
 Stockard, Janice E. Marriage in Culture: Practice and Meaning Across Diverse Societies, Wadsworth and Thomson Learning: Belmont, 2002.
 Ward, Martha; and Monica Edenstein. A World Full of Women, Pearson: Boston, 2009.
 Waihong, Choo. The Kingdom of Women: Life, Love and Death in China's Hidden Mountains. I B Tauris, London, 2017, 
 XU Duoduo. (2015). A Comparison of the Twenty-Eight Lunar Mansions Between Dabaism and Dongbaism. Archaeoastronomy and Ancient Technologies, 3, 2: 61-81 (links: 1. academia.edu; 2. Archaeoastronomy and Ancient Technologies). 
 XU Duoduo. (2017). From Daba Script to Dongba Script: A Diachronic Exploration of the History of Moso Pictographic Writings. Libellarium: Journal for the Research of Writing, Books, and Cultural Heritage Institutions, X, 1: 1-47 (Links: 1. Libellarium; 2. academia.edu). 
 Yuan, Lu. "Land of the Walking Marriages." Natural History. Ed. Sam Mitchell. N.p.: n.p., n.d. 57–65. Print.

References

Further media
 Archived at Ghostarchive and the Wayback Machine:

External links
 Girl's kingdom (via archive.org)
 The Mosuo
 Pictures of Mosuo in Buddhist prayers
 Kingdom of Daughters
 5 Successful Societies Run by Women

Ethnic groups in China
Nakhi people
Matriarchy